Sunrise Sessions is the eleventh studio album American hip hop group Kottonmouth Kings. It was released on July 19, 2011 under Suburban Noize Records.  According to the band, the record has a more prominent reggae sound than previous albums, as well as dubstep and bluegrass influences. The band recorded over 60 songs for the album; some of the b-sides are included as bonus tracks on special editions of the album, and others are included on Hidden Stash V: Bongloads & B-Sides, which was released later in 2011.

Track listing 
CD version

Limited Edition vinyl

Additional personnel 
Additional personnel include:
Mike Kumangai & Patrick Shevelin – Mixing
Tom Baker – Mastering
Patrick Shevelin – Additional Production ("Stoned Silly", "Stay Stoned", "Back in Cali")
Jim Perkins – Additional Production ("Cruzin", "Our Time", "I Don't Wanna Run", "All I Wanna Do"), Additional Vocals ("My Garden", "Be Alright", "Cruzin", "Our Time", "I Don't Wanna Run", "All I Wanna Do")
Steve Dang – Additional Production ("Kalifornia", "Summertime")
Brad Jones – Additional Production ("Stonetown")
Rich Murrell – Guitar ("My Vibrations", "Stay Stoned")
Greg "Gnote" Russel – Guitar ("Summertime", "Kalifornia")
Dirk Freymouth – Guitar ("My Garden", "Ganja Daze", "Great to be Alive", "Life for Me", "Closing Time)
Smoking Scotty Dred – Guitar ("She's Dangerous", "Back in Cali")
Alex Alessandroni – Organs & Keys ("My Garden", "Be Alright", "Kalifornia", "Summertime", "Our Time", "Stay Stoned", "My Vibrations")
BJ "Pimp Daddy" Smith – Additional Vocals ("My Garden", "Boom Clap Sound", "Stoned Silly", "Closing Time", "Be Alright")
Crystal Frandsen – Additional Vocals ("Stonetown", "Love Lost", "Ganja Daze", "Stay Stoned")
Judge D – Vox ("Summertime", "Kalifornia")

Charts

References

2011 albums
Kottonmouth Kings albums